Donald Gerard Stewart (25 November 1928 – 14 July 2016) was an Australian judge, barrister, police officer, Royal Commissioner, and founding chairman of the National Crime Authority of Australia. He spent a lifetime fighting police corruption and drug trafficking and detailed many of his experiences in his memoirs "Recollections of an Unreasonable Man". He attended Sydney Boys High School from 1941 to 1946. He died in 2016 at the age of 87.

See also
Royal Commission of Inquiry into Drug Trafficking ("Stewart Royal Commission") (1980-1983)

References

External links
"Retired Royal Commissioner Don Stewart"
"Police corruption fight failing - The Australian"
"Victorian police corrupt: ex-judge"
"A conversation with Don Stewart"

1928 births
2016 deaths
Australian police officers
Judges of the Supreme Court of New South Wales
Australian memoirists
Judges of the District Court of NSW
20th-century Australian judges